Johannes Wilhelmus Maria van Dijk (4 July 1868 in Amsterdam – 25 August 1938 in Amsterdam) was a Dutch rower who competed in the 1900 Summer Olympics.

He was part of the Dutch boat Minerva Amsterdam, which won the bronze medal in the eight event.

References

External links

 profile

1868 births
1938 deaths
Dutch male rowers
Olympic rowers of the Netherlands
Rowers at the 1900 Summer Olympics
Olympic bronze medalists for the Netherlands
Rowers from Amsterdam
Olympic medalists in rowing
Medalists at the 1900 Summer Olympics